Tyrone Davis (born Tyrone D. Fettson or Tyrone D. Branch, October 3, 1937 – February 9, 2005) was an American  blues and soul singer with a long list of hit records over more than 20 years. Davis had three number 1 hits on the Billboard R&B chart: "Can I Change My Mind" (1968), "Turn Back the Hands of Time" (1970), and "Turning Point" (1975).

Biography
Tyrone Fettson was born in Greenville, Mississippi, United States, to Willie Branch and Ora Lee Jones. Some sources give his date of birth as May 4, 1938, but researchers Bob Eagle and Eric LeBlanc state that his funeral notice gives the October 1937 date.

He moved with his father to Saginaw, Michigan, before moving to Chicago in 1959. Working as a valet/chauffeur for blues singer Freddie King, he started singing in local clubs where he was discovered by record executive/musician Harold Burrage. His early records for small record labels in the city, billed as "Tyrone the Wonder Boy", failed to register. Successful Chicago record producer Carl Davis signed him in 1968 to a new label, Dakar Records, that he was starting as part of a distribution deal with Atlantic, and suggested that Tyrone change his name, which he did by borrowing Carl's last name.

His first release, "A Woman Needs to Be Loved" was flipped when the B-side started to get radio attention. The song, "Can I Change My Mind" featured a change of vocal style for Davis with a softer, more pleading approach and tone. The record shot up the listings and spent three weeks on the top of the Billboard R&B chart, while climbing to number 5 in the Hot 100. It sold over one million and received gold disc recognition. His biggest hit came in early 1970 when "Turn Back The Hands Of Time" also reached number 1 in the R&B chart and went up to number 3 in the Hot 100 pop chart. Written by Jack Daniels and Bonnie Thompson, this disc also sold over one million copies, and received a gold disc awarded by the Recording Industry Association of America in May 1970.

Davis released about 25 singles during his seven years with Dakar, most of them big R&B sellers produced by Willie Henderson. He finally returned to the top spot with "Turning Point" in 1975. Soon afterwards, Davis switched to the major Columbia record label and recorded seven albums over the next five years with producer Leo Graham and arranger James Mack who had collaborated with him for "Turning Point". Major hits with Columbia included "Give It Up" (number 2), "This I Swear" (number 6), and "In the Mood" (number 6). Dubbed the "king of romantic Chicago soul" by MTV, Davis' perceived vulnerability and class endeared him to female soul fans through the 1970s.

1982 brought a change of label to the newly established independent, Highrise and another major hit, "Are You Serious" (number 3 R&B, number 57 pop), again produced by Leo Graham, and written by L.V. Johnson. When Highrise closed the following year, Davis switched to a tiny Los Angeles label, Ocean Front, which lacked promotional muscle to get behind arguably one of his best performances, "Let Me Be Your Pacifier". In 1991, Davis switched to Atlanta label, Ichiban Records, recording three albums including the song "Mom's Apple Pie". In 1994, Davis went to Bellmark/Life Records for one album. Davis' days as a major chart act were over, but he continued to be a popular live attraction and finally signed in 1996 with Malaco Records, the southern-based blues label recording him on a number of albums. He also performed on a PBS special on 1970s soul music in 2004, singing "Turn Back the Hands of Time".

A stroke in September 2004 ended his career and, following complications, he died in a Chicago hospital on February 9, 2005, at the age of 67.

Discography

Studio albums

Singles

References

External links
 The complete Tyrone Davis discography at Soul Express
 
 

1938 births
2005 deaths
American soul musicians
Atlantic Records artists
American rhythm and blues singers
Songwriters from Mississippi
Singers from Mississippi
Musicians from Greenville, Mississippi
Malaco Records artists
Singers from Chicago
African-American male songwriters
20th-century African-American male singers